Victoria Park transfer station, is a Transperth bus station in Victoria Park, Western Australia. It is located at the eastern end of The Causeway, under the bridge carrying the Great Eastern Highway and Canning Highway. It has six stands and is served by 18 Transperth routes operated by Path Transit, Swan Transit and Transdev WA.

Bus routes

Stands A–D

Stands E–F

References

External links
Access map Transperth

Bus stations in Perth, Western Australia